Memorial Park is a public, urban park in Raymore, Missouri. Located at 400 Park Lane in Raymore, Memorial Park is bordered by Raymore Elementary School on the East and Lucy Webb Road on the South. The park contains a pleasant mix of passive and active space. It is also home numerous community events and festivals.

References

Urban public parks
Parks in Cass County, Missouri
Tourist attractions in Raymore, Missouri